The following is a list of current (entering the 2022 WNBA season) Women's National Basketball Association broadcasters for each individual team. The announcers who call the television broadcasts also call the WNBA League Pass Production broadcasts unless noted otherwise. Teams listed under local broadcasts for them are 2021 broadcast teams.

Eastern Conference

Television

Western Conference

Television

Radio

Nationwide

ABC, ESPN, or ESPN2

ESPN airs select regular season games and acts as the exclusive provider for the Semifinals and the WNBA Finals.

Play-by-play
Ryan Ruocco
Pam Ward
Tiffany Greene

Color analysts
Rebecca Lobo
Stephanie White
LaChina Robinson

Sideline reporter
Holly Rowe
Rosalyn Gold-Onwude
Terrika Foster-Brasby

ESPN Deportes

Play-by-play announcers
Kenneth Garay

Color analysts
Pablo Viruega

World Feed
With the 2020 season being played all at one site, the WNBA decided to introduce a "World Feed" for non-ESPN broadcasts. Local markets had the option of using the World Feed or local broadcasters, but games on League Pass, NBAtv, Facebook, and CBSSN all used the world feed. All ESPN productions were also considered to be World Feed broadcasts. Currently the World Feed only existed  for the 2020 season.

Play-by-play announcers
Ron Thulin
Sean Salisbury
Tiffany Greene
Leah Secondo

Color analysts
Carolyn Peck 
Debbie Antonelli
Leah Secondo

Twitter
Twitter signed up to carry 10 WNBA broadcasts in 2020 and carried the contract over to 2021. The games focus more on analytics and use a mix of local pxp and analysts from the G League and the WNBA.

Play-by-play announcers
Frank Hanrahan
Tiffany Greene
Kevin Danna
Angel Gray

Color analysts
Christy Winters Scott
Rosalyn Gold-Onwude
LaChina Robinson
Carla McGhee
Debbie Antonelli

NBA TV
NBAtv will carry select games throughout the season. These games will remain available on WNBA League Pass and will be a simulcast of the world feed television broadcast.

CBS Sports Network
Beginning with the 2019 season CBSSN entered into a contract to broadcast a minimum of 40 WNBA games per season. It is a multi-year deal, but the length of the deal wasn't announced.

WNBA League Pass
Every game not broadcast on an ESPN Network or CBSSN is carried live for everyone to watch on WNBA League Pass. No blackouts apply outside of the ESPN and CBSSN productions.

See also 
 List of current National Football League broadcasters
 List of current Major League Baseball broadcasters
 List of current National Basketball Association broadcasters
 List of current National Hockey League broadcasters
 List of current Major League Soccer broadcasters

References

 
National Basketball Association broadcasters
Lists of Women's National Basketball Association broadcasters